Carl Mundy could refer to:

Carl Epting Mundy Jr. (1935-2014), 30th Commandant of the United States Marine Corps, father of Carl E. Mundy III
Carl E. Mundy III (born 1960), United States Marine Corps Lieutenant General, son of Carl Epting Mundy Jr.